Judy Prescott  is an American actress and poet.  She has performed many roles on stage and screen since 1987 and is the author of the book Searching For Cecy: Reflections on Alzheimer's.

Early life

Judith Neal Prescott, daughter of Mary Boodell Prescott and R. Donald Prescott Jr., was born in Glen Ridge, New Jersey.  She grew up in Mountain Lakes, New Jersey, less than an hour outside of New York City, with her brothers Tom and John.

Life and Career 

After graduating college, Prescott moved to New York City, where she began work as an actress in the theater.  Upon her agent’s suggestion, she moved to Los Angeles, where she got her first television job in the pilot episode of Roseanne. From here, Judy landed a series regular role on NBC'’s Working Girl alongside Sandra Bullock.  Her most recent work includes episodes of True Blood, Grey’s Anatomy, Cold Case, Bones, and the films Islander, and Hit and Runway.

Prescott is the author of Searching For Cecy: Reflections on Alzheimer's (2011).  This collection of poetry explores her mother’s unexpected journey into Alzheimer’s and her own struggle to find peace.  The book is illustrated by the art of four members of the Prescott family and a portion of its proceeds go to the Alzheimer’s Association, Maine chapter.

Filmography

Television

References

External links 

Living people
American film actresses
American television actresses
American poets
American women poets
Year of birth missing (living people)
21st-century American women